The 1972–73 British Ice Hockey season featured the Northern League for teams from Scotland and the north of England and the Southern League for teams from the rest of England. 

Dundee Rockets won the Northern League and Altrincham Aces won the Southern League. Whitley Warriors won the Icy Smith Cup.

Northern League

Regular season

Southern League

Regular season

Spring Cup

Final
Murrayfield Racers defeated the Dundee Rockets

Icy Smith Cup

Final
Whitley Warriors defeated Murrayfield Racers 21-9

Autumn Cup

References

British
1972 in English sport
1973 in English sport
1972 in Scottish sport
1973 in Scottish sport